Darkness in the Light is the fifth studio album by American metalcore band Unearth. The album was released on July 5, 2011, in Europe through Metal Blade Records. The album features Justin Foley of Killswitch Engage on drums, on all tracks.

Album information 
Darkness in the Light was recorded at Zing Studios in Westfield, Massachusetts with producer Adam Dutkiewicz. The effort was mixed by Mark Lewis from Audiohammer Studios in Sanford, Florida.

Track listing

Credits 
Production and performance credits are adapted from the album liner notes.

Personnel 
Unearth
 Trevor Phipps – lead vocals
 Buz McGrath – lead guitar
 Ken Susi – rhythm guitar, backing vocals, co-production, engineering
 John "Slo" Maggard – bass, piano, backing vocals

Session musicians
 Justin Foley (Killswitch Engage) – drums

Additional musicians
 Jessie Crandall – group vocals
 Ryan Bentley – group vocals
 Adam Crouse – group vocals
 Karl Lawson – group vocals
 Pat Politano – group vocals
 Chad Boudreau – group vocals
 Adam Stasio – group vocals

Production
 Adam Dutkiewicz – production, engineering
 Alan Douches – mastering
 James Mercer – cover
 Dave Stauble – band photo
 Miked (Darkicon Design) – layout, package design
 Mark Lewis – mixing

Studios 
 Zing Recording Studios, Westfield, MA – vocals, drums, piano
 System Recordings, Grafton, MA – vocals, guitars
 Wicked Good Studios, Southampton, MA – bass
 West Westside Mastering Studio – mastering
 Audiohammer Studios, Sanford, FL – mixing

Charts

References

External links 
 
  Darkness in the Light at Metal Blade

2011 albums
Albums produced by Adam Dutkiewicz
Metal Blade Records albums
Unearth albums